Jill Savery (born May 2, 1972) is an American competitor in synchronised swimming and Olympic champion.

Born in Fort Lauderdale, Florida, she competed for the American team that won a gold medal in synchronized team at the 1996 Summer Olympics in Atlanta.

See also
 List of members of the International Swimming Hall of Fame

References

1972 births
Living people
American synchronized swimmers
Synchronized swimmers at the 1996 Summer Olympics
Olympic gold medalists for the United States in synchronized swimming
Olympic medalists in synchronized swimming
World Aquatics Championships medalists in synchronised swimming
Synchronized swimmers at the 1991 World Aquatics Championships
Medalists at the 1996 Summer Olympics